Jeszlene Zhou (Simplified Chinese: 周子芸) is a Singapore-born former actress.

Early life and education 
Zhou spent her teenage years in Methodist Girls' School and graduated from The University of Sydney with a Master in Strategic Public Relations, the spring of 2015. She previously attained a Bachelor of Arts with distinction from Melbourne.

Career
After a decade of being in the limelight, Zhou is currently working in digital communications. She has been published in PRNew's Media Training Guidebook Vol.5.

Films and television

Feature films

Short films

Television

References

External links 
Official Website

Singaporean people of Teochew descent
Singaporean actresses
Living people
Year of birth missing (living people)